The 601st Bombardment Squadron is an inactive United States Air Force unit.  It was assigned to the 398th Bombardment Group, and served in Combat in the European Theater of Operations, flying its last mission in late April 1945.  The squadron moved to Drew Field, Florida, where it was inactivated on 1 September 1945.

In 1985, the squadron was consolidated with the 601st Tactical Air Support Squadron, stationed at Sembach Air Base, Germany.  The consolidated squadron was last assigned to the 601st Tactical Control Wing.

History

World War II
The 601st Bombardment Squadron was activated at Ephrata Army Air Base, Washington in early 1943 as one of the four original squadrons of the 398th Bombardment Group.  The squadron trained under II Bomber Command with Boeing B-17 Flying Fortresses.  The squadron's training was interrupted in July 1943, when it became a Replacement Training Unit. Replacement training units were oversized units which trained aircrews prior to their deployment to combat theaters. In November, replacement training ended and the squadron resumed its preparation for overseas deployment.

The 601st deployed to England in April 1944 aboard the troopship . Its parent group was the last B-17 group to be assigned to VIII Bomber Command. The squadron flew its first combat mission the following month.  Until V-E Day the squadron participated in the air offensive against Nazi Germany, bombing such targets as factories in Berlin, marshalling yards in Saarbrücken, shipping facilities in Kiel, oil refineries in Merseburg and aircraft factories in Münster.

In June 1944, prior to Operation Overlord, the Normandy invasion, the squadron temporarily suspended its strategic bombing to attack coastal defenses and enemy troop concentrations on the Cherbourg peninsula. Eighth Air Force took advantage of the diversion from strategic bombing to allow newly arrived units like the 601st to fly attacks against nearby targets to gain combat experience.  The first target assigned was a V-1 flying bomb launch site near Sottevast, but the unit's inexperience and overcast conditions in the target area caused it to return to its home station without bombing.

The squadron also struck gun positions near Eindhoven to support Operation Market Garden, the airborne attacks in the Netherlands, in September and attacked power stations, railroads and bridges during the Battle of the Bulge from December until January 1945.  It attacked airfields in March 1945 during Operation Varsity, the airborne assault across the Rhine River.

The squadron flew its last combat mission on 25 April 1945 when it attacked the airfield at Plzeň, Czechoslovakia. After the German surrender it transported liberated prisoners of war from Germany to France. It left Europe in May and returned to the United States aboard the passenger liner , arriving at the New York Port of Embarkation on 29 June. Squadron members were given thirty days leave, and a cadre assembled at Drew Field, Florida, where the squadron was inactivated in August 1945.

Cold War
On 19 September 1985 the 601st Tactical Air Support Squadron, a unit that had been activated at Ramstein Air Base, Germany in 1974 as a forward air control unit, and the 601st Bombardment Squadron were consolidated.  The consolidated squadron was inactivated in 1988.

Lineage
601st Bombardment Squadron
 Constituted as the 601st Bombardment Squadron (Heavy) on 15 February 1943
 Activated on 1 March 1943
 Redesignated 601st Bombardment Squadron Heavy in 1944
 Inactivated on 1 September 1945
 Consolidated on 19 September 1985 with the 601st Tactical Air Support Squadron as the 601st Tactical Air Support Squadron

601st Tactical Air Support Squadron
 Constituted as the 601st Tactical Air Support Squadron on 31 January 1974
 Activated on 8 July 1974
 Consolidated on 19 September 1985 with the 601st Bombardment Squadron
 Inactivated in 1988

Assignments
 398th Bombardment Group, 1 March 1943 – 1 September 1945
 601st Tactical Air Support Group, 8 July 1974
 601st Tactical Control Wing, 1 November 1975
 601st Tactical Air Support Group, 1 May 1977 – 1988

Stations
 Ephrata Army Air Base, Washington, 1 March 1943
 Bishop Army Air Field, California, 5 April 1943
 Geiger Field, Washington, 29 April 1943
 Rapid City Army Air Base, South Dakota, 10 June 1943 – 4 April 1944
 RAF Nuthampstead (AAF-131), England, 22 April 1944 – 26 May 1945
 Drew Field, Florida, 3 July 1945 – 1 September 1945
 Ramstein Air Base, Germany. 8 July 1974
 Wiesbaden Air Base, Germany,
 Sembach Air Base, Germany, January 1976 – 1988

Aircraft
 B-17 Flying Fortress, 1943–1945

Awards and campaigns

See also

References

Notes

Bibliography

External links
 398th Bomb Group Association website
 601st Bomb Squadron photos at American Air Museum in Britain

Military units and formations established in 1943
Bombardment squadrons of the United States Army Air Forces
World War II strategic bombing units